Héctor Mellado (24 February 1925 – 17 September 2007) was a Chilean cyclist. He competed in the individual and team road race events at the 1952 Summer Olympics.

References

External links
 

1925 births
2007 deaths
Chilean male cyclists
Olympic cyclists of Chile
Cyclists at the 1952 Summer Olympics